Whangamōmona is a small township in the Stratford District and Manawatū-Whanganui Region in New Zealand.

Demographics

Whangamōmona had a population of 126 at the 2018 New Zealand census, a decrease of 24 people (−16.0%) since the 2013 census, and a decrease of 42 people (−25.0%) since the 2006 census. There were 54 households, comprising 72 males and 54 females, giving a sex ratio of 1.33 males per female. The median age was 49.7 years (compared with 37.4 years nationally), with 21 people (16.7%) aged under 15 years, 12 (9.5%) aged 15 to 29, 78 (61.9%) aged 30 to 64, and 18 (14.3%) aged 65 or older.

Ethnicities were 92.9% European/Pākehā, 14.3% Māori, and 2.4% other ethnicities. People may identify with more than one ethnicity.

The percentage of people born overseas was 7.1, compared with 27.1% nationally.

Although some people chose not to answer the census's question about religious affiliation, 57.1% had no religion, and 28.6% were Christian.

Of those at least 15 years old, 9 (8.6%) people had a bachelor's or higher degree, and 33 (31.4%) people had no formal qualifications. The median income was $26,000, compared with $31,800 nationally. 12 people (11.4%) earned over $70,000 compared to 17.2% nationally. The employment status of those at least 15 was that 63 (60.0%) people were employed full-time, 27 (25.7%) were part-time, and 3 (2.9%) were unemployed.

History 

The first European settlers arrived in 1895, with the town proper established some 2 years later. Growth of the town was seriously affected by the loss of 51 men (including the smaller nearby settlements of Kohuratahi and Tahora) in the First World War and a major flood in 1924. The town recovered with arrival of the railway line in 1933 and electrification in 1959. However the town went into decline again and the school closed in 1979, followed nine years later by the post office.

In July 2020, the name of the locality was officially gazetted as Whangamōmona by the New Zealand Geographic Board.

Republic Day 
In 1989, regional council boundaries were redrawn, with an emphasis on connected catchments. These revised maps made Whangamōmona part of the then-Manawatu-Wanganui Region since the Whangamōmona River is a tributary of the Whanganui River. Residents objected, as they wanted to continue being part of the Taranaki Region, and on 1 November 1989, they responded by declaring themselves the "Republic of Whangamomona" at the first Republic Day. Though the move began as a pointed protest, the town continued to hold a celebratory Republic Day once a year, during which a vote for President was held. The day has become a local festival day, and attracts visitors from throughout the North Island. In 2001, the celebration became biennial, held in January to take advantage of the summer weather.

Presidents
Ian Kjestrup (1989–1999)
After being put on the ballot without his knowledge, Kjestrup became the first elected President, serving 10 years.

Billy Gumboot the Goat (1999–2001)
Gumboot was the first elected animal. He won election by a landslide, although some residents speculate he ate the other challengers' ballots in order to win. He died in office after serving for 18 months.

Tai the Poodle (2003–2004)
Tai retired after he was attacked by a mastiff, but some speculate it was an assassination attempt. Though he survived the attack, Tai was left unfit for service and died in 2010.

Sir Murt "Murtle the Turtle" Kennard (2005–2015)
The local garage owner fought off strong competition from former President Kjestrup to become the 4th President. He was re-elected in 2009 by one vote, and again by a landslide in 2011. Kennard died at New Plymouth Hospice on 25 October 2015.

Vicki Pratt (2015–2017)
Pratt was the first female President appointed for the Whangamomona Republic.

John Herlihy (2017–present)
Herlihy was elected ahead of Jack Spearow, Lili Jiao (who wanted to be a cat) and Ted (who was already a cat), despite reported attempts by Spearow to steal ballots. On Republic Day 2019 (19 January) President Herlihy was re-elected for a second term, having fought off challenges from Maketoni the Teddy Bear, Sherman the Cockatoo, Eunice the Sheep, Griff Robb (who proposed that the land-locked nation should enter into maritime tourism) and a Mrs Brown look-alike at the polls.  Controversy surrounded the election due to the disappearance of candidate Eunice the Sheep, with commentators noting that mutton sandwiches were for sale at the Republic Day barbecue.

References

Further reading

External links 
 1951 photo of trains crossing at Whangamomona

Populated places established in 1895
Populated places in Manawatū-Whanganui
Micronations
1895 establishments in New Zealand
Stratford District, New Zealand